Ekker Butte is a  elevation summit located in the northern reach of Glen Canyon National Recreation Area, in Wayne County of Utah, United States. Distant views of this remote butte can be seen from the Grand View Point and Green River Overlooks at Island in the Sky of Canyonlands National Park. This geological landmark is named for the pioneering Art Ekker family which operated the nearby Robbers Roost Ranch and grazed cattle on land adjacent to the nearby Maze. Arthur Benjamin Ekker (1911–1978) took Robert Redford on a tour of nearby Robbers Roost, the hideout of outlaw Butch Cassidy and the Wild Bunch.

Geology
Ekker Butte is composed of hard, fine-grained Wingate Sandstone, which is the remains of wind-borne sand dunes deposited approximately 200 million years ago in the Late Triassic. This Wingate sandstone, capped by Kayenta Formation, forms steep cliffs as it overlays softer layers of the Chinle Formation, which is exposed down to a prominent ledge formed by the Moss Back Member. Slopes below this ledge are Moenkopi Formation, down to the White Rim. Precipitation runoff drains into the nearby Green River, which in turn is part of the Colorado River drainage basin.

Climbing
The first ascent of Ekker Butte was made in January 1987, by Tom Thomas and Dan Mathews via the  South Tower.

Climate
Spring and fall are the most favorable seasons to visit Ekker Butte. According to the Köppen climate classification system, it is located in a Cold semi-arid climate zone, which is defined by the coldest month having an average mean temperature below , and at least 50% of the total annual precipitation being received during the spring and summer.

See also
 Geology of the Canyonlands area
 Colorado Plateau

Gallery

References

External links

 Ekker Butte: weather forecast
 Art Ekker photos and story: Canyoncountryzephyr.com
 Art Ekker photo

Landforms of Wayne County, Utah
Sandstone formations of the United States
Colorado Plateau
Glen Canyon National Recreation Area
Buttes of Utah
Rock formations of Utah
North American 1000 m summits